The 2012–13 Liga Nacional de Ascenso de Honduras season was the 34th edition of the Liga Nacional de Ascenso de Honduras, the second division of football in Honduras. For this season, promotion was changed from a two-legged home-and-away match to a one-legged match in a neutral ground. Parrillas One was the promoted team to the 2013–14 Honduran Liga Nacional after defeating Juticalpa F.C. in penalties in Estadio Carlos Miranda in Comayagua.

2012-13 teams

Teams from Zona Norte y Atlántica
Arsenal (Roatan)
Social Sol (Olanchito)
Sonaguera FC (Sonaguera)
Trujillo FC (Trujillo)
Unión Sabá (Sabá)
Yoro FC (Yoro)

Teams from Zona Norte y Occidente
Atlético Municipal (San Francisco de Yojoa)
Real Juventud (Santa Bárbara)
CD Honduras (El Progreso)
Olimpia Occidental (La Entrada)
Parrillas One (Tela)
Sula (La Lima)
Villanueva FC (Villanueva)

Teams from Zona Central
Atlético Esperanzano (La Esperanza)
Atlético Independiente (Siguatepeque)
Comayagua FC (Comayagua)
Marcala FC (Marcala)
Municipal Paceño (La Paz)
Nuevo San Isidro (Choluteca)
UPN (Tegucigalpa)

Teams from Zona Centro-Sur y Oriente
Alianza de Becerra (San Francisco de Becerra)
Atlético Olanchano (Catacamas)
Juticalpa F.C. (Juticalpa)
San Lorenzo (San Lorenzo)
Olimpia B (Teupasenti)
Valencia (Tegucigalpa)

Apertura

Quarterfinals

Semifinals

Final

Juticalpa won 7-3 on aggregate score.

Clausura

Quarterfinals

Semifinals

Finals

Parrillas One won 1-0 on aggregate score.

Promotion Final

Relegation

Zona Norte

Sonaguera FC relegated.

Zona Centro-Sur

Municipal Paceño relegated.

References

2012–13 in Honduran football
Hon
Honduran Liga Nacional de Ascenso seasons